The Duchy of Massa and Principality of Carrara was a small state that controlled the towns of Massa and Carrara from 1473 until 1829.

History

 
Although the city of Massa had already known its maximum medieval splendor in the 11th century with the Marquisate of Massa and Corsica ruled by the Obertenghi family, the original nucleus of the state was officially born on 22 February 1473 with the purchase of the Lordship of Carrara by the Lordship of Massa in the time headed by the Marquis Jacopo Malaspina, who obtained it from Count Antoniotto Fileremo of Genoa, progenitor of the Fregoso line. The noble title of the Malaspina family therefore became that of Marquises of Massa and lords of Carrara.

From the purchase of the Carrara territory onwards, the seat of Jacopo Malaspina, one of the sons of Antonio Alberico I Malaspina, member of the branch of the family located in Fosdinovo, was located in the city of Carrara, but due to the frequent clashes with the French invaders who occurred often, he and his successors moved to Massa.

Within two generations the Malaspina family died out in male descent and Ricciarda, Iacopo's niece and last direct heir of the lineage, married in 1520 with Lorenzo Cybo, a member of an influential family of Genoese aristocrats related to the Medici and Pope Innocent VIII. From the marriage the new Cybo-Malaspina family originated: the son of Ricciarda and Lorenzo, Alberico I Cybo-Malaspina obtained the government of Massa and Carrara in 1554. Under his administration the fiefdom experienced a very favorable period of development, thanks also to the advantageous economic situation in the marble market, which was in great demand by the Renaissance courts of the time. Alberico I, aware that his statelet was surrounded by more powerful and influential neighbors, decided to submit to the Holy Roman Empire of Charles V of Habsburg in 1554. Thanks to its cultural and economic successes, the city of Carrara obtained the rank of marquisate in 1558. In 1568 Massa was elevated to principality by the Emperor Maximilian II. In 1664 Leopold I of Habsburg raised the Principality of Massa to the rank of duchy and the Marquisate of Carrara to a principality.

The Cybo-Malaspina took the title of Dukes of Massa and Princes of Carrara starting from Alberico II. In 1741 Maria Teresa Cybo-Malaspina, the only representative of the family, married Ercole III d'Este, the only male heir of the Duchy of Modena and Reggio. Their daughter Maria Beatrice d'Este thus had the government on both territories, which however remained separate state entities until her death.

In 1796 the Este were deprived of their possessions by the troops of Napoleon Bonaparte. The latter incorporated the territory into the Cispadane Republic, then making it flow into the Cisalpine Republic. During this period the region was briefly disputed against Napoleon by the Austrians of the anti-French coalition (1799) and experienced a rapid succession of different administrative systems, more or less provisional. As a last administrative change, in 1806, the French emperor assigned the Duchy of Massa and Carrara to the Principality of Lucca and Piombino, governed by his older sister Elisa Bonaparte Baciocchi. During the Napoleonic domination Maria Beatrice d'Este (then ruler of the Duchy) was forced to take refuge in Vienna with the family of her husband, Ferdinand Karl, Archduke of Austria-Este, uncle of Emperor Francis II, from whom she governed her duchy in exile. With the fall of the Napoleonic regime, the Congress of Vienna again assigned to Maria Beatrice the ancestor duchy that had been stolen from her. After the Restoration and the end of the independence of various local entities such as the Marquisate of Fosdinovo, the Duchy of Massa and Carrara included, in addition to the traditional territories, numerous others territories in Tuscany.

In 1829, on the death of Maria Beatrice, the duchy of Massa and the principality of Carrara were annexed to the duchy of Modena and Reggio, led by her son Francis IV. In 1860, with the deposition, the previous year, of Francis V, the duchy of Modena and Reggio (also including the territories of Massa and Carrara) was annexed to the Kingdom of Sardinia, of which it constituted the province of Massa and Carrara.

Marquis, Princes, then Dukes of Massa and Carrara
 Giacomo I Malaspina (1445–1481)  Marquis of Massa and Lord of Carrara since 1473
 Alberico II Malaspina (1481–1519)
 Ricciarda Cybo-Malaspina (1519–1546) and (1547–1553)
 Giulio I Cybo-Malaspina (1546–1547)
Alberico I Cybo-Malaspina (1554–1623) Marquis of Massa and Carrara from 1558, then Prince of Massa and Marquis of Carrara from 1568
Carlo I Cybo-Malaspina (1623–1662)
Alberico II Cybo-Malaspina (1662–1690) Duke of Massa and Prince of Carrara from 1664 
Carlo II Cybo-Malaspina (1690–1710)
Alberico III Cybo-Malaspina (1710–1715)
Alderamo Cybo-Malaspina (1715–1731)
Maria Teresa Cybo-Malaspina (1731–1790)
Maria Beatrice (1790–1796) Duchess of Massa and Princess of Carrara
 Annexation of the Cispadane Republic, Cisalpine Republic, Italian Republic and Kingdom of Italy following the invasion of Napoleon (1796–1806)
 Elisa Bonaparte Baciocchi (1806–1814)
 Maria Beatrice (1815–1829) Duchess of Massa and Princess of Carrara
The duchy is annexed to the Duchy of Modena
 Francesco IV d'Este (1829–1846)
 Francesco V d'Este (1846–1859)

Policy and economy
The merge of the Malaspina family with the Cybo family brought the territory to a rather lavish court life. In the conduct of foreign policy the Cybo-Malaspina maintained a role as an intermediary between the Grand Duchy of Tuscany and the Republic of Genoa.

Alberico I brought large urban restructurations in the cities of Carrara and Massa, mainly for prestige reasons. Both cities were equipped with new city walls - with representative functions, rather than military, since the policy of the territory was not expansionist  - and new ducal palaces. In Carrara was established the Office of Marble (1564), to regulate the marble mining industry.

The city of Massa, in particular, saw much of its plan redesigned (new roads, plazas, intersections, pavings) in order to make it worthy of an Italian country's capital.

The War of Spanish Succession (1701–1714) was the beginning of the period of deep economic crisis for the duchy. The Empire punished with heavy fines the Cybo-Malspina, who had given hospitality to French troops on its territory. Already Alberich III, but especially Alderamo, found themselves forced to sell many city goods. Alderamo arrived to force people to buy food at a premium, and also because of the luxurious and extravagant lifestyle of the nobleman, the economics of the Duchy was brought to its knees. The financial situation recovered only by dynastic union between the families of the Malaspina and the Este, achieved with the marriage of Maria Teresa and Ercole d'Este in 1741.

From that date, the Duchy of Massa and Carrara gradually lost its political autonomy, going to gravitate more and more closely into the city of Modena sphere of influence. Under the domination of the Este, the Duchy of Massa Carrara rose to occupy a strategic position, in that it provided a sea outlet to the hinterland domains and promised an easier trade route. Already under Maria Teresa road links between the Duchy of Modena and Reggio to Massa & Carrara were significantly improved. These road reform attempts include the construction of the  Via Vandelli, starting as early as 1738.

In 1751, was made a first attempt for the excavation of a dock and the construction of a port in the city of Carrara. The port would have been functional to the trade and military activities of the Este, would have housed in a safe place the small fleet of the Duchy of Modena and, finally, would have been essential to free the marble exports from dependence of other nearby ports. The coast, however, had a tendency to silt up and after a few years the construction work had to be suspended.

In 1807 Napoleon's engineers built the important mail road to the Foce, to link the cities of Massa and Carrara through the inland hills. During the Napoleonic rule were also initiated other public works such as the bonification of the plains, the plantation of coastal pine trees to combat malaria and arrangement of river banks. These works were continued by Maria Beatrice and successors in subsequent decades.
In 1821 the Este Land Registry was established, with the task of regulating and listing the properties of the inhabitants of the duchy.

The years following the annexation to the Duchy of Modena were particularly complex, both for the insurrectional riots that characterized the historical period, and for the economic crisis, which have long gripped the region. The rulers tried several times to exit the stagnation in promoting the construction of infrastructure to increase the volume of trade, but the lack of money often proves an insurmountable obstacle.

A second attempt to build the port of Carrara was entrusted by Duke Francis IV to the engineer Aschenden in 1830, but the project was never made for lack of funds. A dock loader, which came to be the first authentic port core of Carrara was built successfully only in 1851, thanks to the English engineer and tycoon William Walton.
In 1846 the Count Francesco del Medico proposed to the Duke Francis V the construction of the Marble Railway of Carrara, to link the marble quarries to the sea and thereby facilitating the transport of blocks to the areas for sorting, loading, and shipping. This project was also suspended for lack of funds. The Marble Railway was finally built after the Italian unification (1871–1890).

In the last years of the duchy, an increasing number of clashes was seen between the liberals and the ducal government, especially in Carrara.
The territory was chosen by Count Camillo Benso di Cavour and Napoleon III to organize popular anti-Austrian riots and give France an opportunity to intervene on the side of Piedmont in Italy, giving way to the Second Italian War of Independence.

References

 
Italian states
Duchy of Massa and Carrara
Duchy of Massa and Carrara
Duchy of Massa and Carrara
1473 establishments in Europe
15th-century establishments in Italy
1829 disestablishments in Italy
Malaspina family
States and territories established in 1473
States and territories disestablished in 1829